Richard Southwell may refer to:

Richard Southwell (courtier) (1504–1564), English courtier, Master-General of the Ordnance and Custos Rotulorum of Norfolk
Richard Southwell (died 1514) (1449–1514), British administrator from Norfolk
Richard Southwell alias Darcy (died 1600), MP for Gatton
Richard Southwell (Askeaton politician) (died 1688), Irish MP for Askeaton
Richard Southwell (Limerick politician) (c. 1667–1729), his son, Irish MP for Limerick County
Sir Richard V. Southwell (1888–1970), English mathematician and engineering science academic